The Sweet Life is an album by American jazz organist Reuben Wilson recorded in 1972 and released on the Groove Merchant label.

Reception 

Allmusic's Jason Ankeny said: "After a series of sugary soul-jazz dates for Blue Note, Reuben Wilson resurfaced on Groove Merchant with The Sweet Life. The title notwithstanding, the session is his darkest and hardest-edged to date, complete with a physicality missing from previous efforts".

Track listing
All compositions by Reuben Wilson except where noted.
 "Inner City Blues" (Marvin Gaye, James Nyx Jr.) – 4:45
 "Creampuff" – 5:30
 "Sugar" (Stanley Turrentine, Ted Daryll) – 6:09
 "I'll Take You There" (Albertis Isbell) – 6:25
 "The Sweet Life" – 6:11
 "Never Can Say Goodbye" (Clifton Davis) – 4:15

Personnel
Reuben Wilson – organ
Bill Hardman − trumpet
Ramon Morris − tenor saxophone
Lloyd Davis − guitar
Mickey Bass – bass
Thomas Derrick − drums

References

Groove Merchant albums
Reuben Wilson albums
1972 albums
Albums produced by Sonny Lester